"Father Figure" is a song by English singer-songwriter George Michael from his debut studio album, Faith (1987). It was released on 28 December 1987 as the album's fourth single by Columbia Records. The song reached number one on the US Billboard Hot 100 and number 11 on the UK Singles Chart. Additionally it was a top 5 hit in Australia, Belgium, Canada, Iceland, Ireland, the Netherlands and Spain.

Background
George Michael had this to say on the genesis of "Father Figure":

Composition
The song is an R&B ballad, and also features elements of Middle Eastern music and gospel.

On the tracks origins George Michael said:It started off with a rhythm track with a snare, and when you play it like that it sounds a bit like Prince. But I must have been listening to it without the snare and gone, “Oh my God, that totally changes the record!” It suddenly becomes a gospel record.

Chart performance
Released in the United Kingdom in December 1987, "Father Figure" reached number eleven on the UK Singles Chart – the first time Michael had failed to reach the top ten in his home country.

In the United States, "Father Figure" debuted on 16 January 1988 at number 49, while "Faith" was still prominent (at number nine) in the top ten of the chart. "Father Figure" reached number one on 27 February 1988, staying at the top for two weeks. Altogether, the single spent 17 weeks in the chart.

Critical reception
Sue Dando from Smash Hits wrote, "Once again, George unweils a blinding talent for wonderful sentiment and swoony lovesome lyrics, all elegantly swathed in pristine "epic" production and the usual echoey voice-oice which trails-ails off almost every note-ote...It's in a similar "vein" (though not nearly as good) as "A Different Corner", it's perfect Radio Two fodder, and it will doubtless be a top ten hit."

Music video
The accompanying music video for "Father Figure" depicts a relationship between a cab driver (Michael) and a high-fashion model (Tania Coleridge). Various intercut flashbacks tell a backstory. Michael and Andy Morahan won "Best Direction of a Video" at the 1988 MTV Video Music Awards for the video.

Track listings
 UK single (7")
 "Father Figure" – 5:40
 "Love's In Need Of Love Today"  – 4:42

 US single (CD and cassette)
 "Father Figure" – 5:40
 "Look at Your Hands" – 4:37

 International single (CD and cassette maxi single)
 "Father Figure" – 5:28
 "Love's In Need Of Love Today"  – 4:42
 "Father Figure"  – 5:28

Charts and certifications

Weekly charts

Year-end charts

Certifications and sales

Sampled in 
P.M. Dawn - Looking Through Patient Eyes (1993)
L.L. Cool J - Father (1997)
Destiny's Child - Winter Paradise (2001)

References

External links
 

1987 songs
1987 singles
Billboard Hot 100 number-one singles
Cashbox number-one singles
Columbia Records singles
George Michael songs
Music videos directed by George Michael
Music videos directed by Andy Morahan
Song recordings produced by George Michael
Songs written by George Michael
MTV Video Music Award for Best Direction
Songs about fathers